In information geometry, Chentsov's theorem states that the Fisher information metric is, up to rescaling, the unique Riemannian metric on a statistical manifold that is invariant under sufficient statistics.

See also 

Fisher information
Sufficient statistic
Information geometry

References 

 
 Shun'ichi Amari, Hiroshi Nagaoka (2000) Methods of information geometry, Translations of mathematical monographs; v. 191, American Mathematical Society.

Differential geometry
Information geometry
Statistical distance